The 2015 Rugby Europe Sevens Division A tournament is the second division of Rugby Europe's 2015 sevens season. This edition was hosted by the cities of Esztergom and Gdańsk from 6–21 June, with the winner promoted to the 2016 Grand Prix and the two teams with the fewest points relegated to Conference 1. Teams finishing in the top three also advanced to a repechage tournament for qualification to the final Olympic qualification tournament.

Standings

Note Tiebreaker for Sweden and Denmark for Relegation TBD

Esztergom

Pool stage

Pool A

Pool B

Knockout stage

Bowl

Plate

Cup

Gdańsk

Pool stage

Pool A

Pool B

Knockout stage

Bowl

Plate

Cup

References

A
2015 rugby sevens competitions
2015 in Hungarian sport
2015 in Polish sport